Ignition is the debut solo album by English singer-songwriter John Waite (ex-vocalist for The Babys).  It was released on Chrysalis Records in June 1982 and produced by Neil Giraldo (producer/guitarist for Pat Benatar, who was on the same label).

Two singles were lifted from the record: the Holly Knight-penned "Change" which initially failed to make a significant dent on any chart except for the Hot Mainstream Rock Tracks, where it scored the No. 16 position.  It was, however, one of MTV's most popular early videos.  Upon the 1985 release of the soundtrack to the film Vision Quest, the single was re-issued and broke into the top 50 on the Pop charts.  Its follow-up single was "Going to the Top".

A few well-known musicians guested on the album as well.  Singer Patty Smyth (then in the band Scandal) handled vocal backing, and drummer Frankie LaRocka (also from Scandal) and bassist Don Nossov (who also played with Benatar) guest here.

Track listing

"White Heat" (John Waite) – 3:22
"Change" (Holly Knight) – 3:15
"Mr. Wonderful" (John Waite, Ivan Kral) – 4:07
"Going to the Top" (Waite, Tim Pierce) – 4:36
"Desperate Love" (Waite, Kral) – 3:55
"Temptation" (Chas Sandford) – 2:59
"Be My Baby Tonight" (Waite, Kral) – 3:22
"Make It Happen" (Waite, Bruce Brody) – 3:18
"Still in Love with You" (Paul Sabu) – 3:42
"Wild Life" (Waite, Kral) – 3:23

Personnel 

 John Waite – lead vocals
 Bruce Brody – keyboards, pianos
 Ivan Kral – keyboards, pianos, rhythm guitars
 Tim Pierce – lead guitars
 Spyder Downtone Butane James – guitar solo on "Mr. Wonderful" 
 Donnie Nossov – bass, backing vocals
 Frankie LaRocka – drums, percussion
 Crispin Cioe – saxophones
 Arno Hecht – saxophones 
 "Hollywood Paul" Litteral – trumpets
 Rahni Kugel –  backing vocals
 Ilana Morrilo – backing vocals 
 Patty Smyth – backing vocals

Handclaps and screams on "White Heat"
 Mark Betz, Brendan Bourke, Dave Lang, Chris Pollan, Suzan, John Waite and John Elijah Wright

Production 
 Neil Giraldo – producer, mixing 
 Bob Clearmountain – engineer, mixing 
 Jeff Hendrickson – engineer 
 Neil Dorfsman – assistant engineer 
 Bob Ludwig – original mastering at Masterdisk (New York, NY)
 Dave Lang – studio assistant 
 Chris Pollan – studio assistant 
 Miss Pam – studio assistant 
 Jon Astley – remastering 
 Sandy Pearman and Dyer/Kahn, Inc. – design
 Brian Aris – photography

References

Chrysalis Records albums
1982 debut albums
John Waite albums